Herbert Marshall (1890–1966) was an English actor.

Herbert Marshall may also refer to:
 Herbert Menzies Marshall (1841–1913), English watercolour painter and illustrator
 Sir Joseph Herbert Marshall (1851–1918), British concert impresario and Lord Mayor of Leicester
 Herbert Marshall (statistician) (1888–1977), Canadian academic and statistician
 Herbert Marshall (writer) (1906–1991), British writer, filmmaker, scenic designer, and scholar of Russian literature